Snipe Loch (NS385173) or Loch Snipe is a freshwater loch. It is situated in a low-lying area close to the B742 road next to Clocaird Farm in the Parish of Coylton, East Ayrshire, Scotland. The loch lies to the north of Martnaham Loch, 5 miles (7 km) east of Ayr.

History

Snipe Loch is a post-glacial 'Kettle Hole' fed by the outflow from Loch Fergus and its outflow running into Martnaham Loch. The early OS maps show a sluice on the outflow, allowing the water level to be controlled. The loch was fed by springs situated near the lane at Cloncaird Farm. The early OS maps show an arm of the loch running almost as far as the lane to old Glencaird (sic).

Etymology
The name could appropriately refer to the bird, snipe, Lymnocryptes minimus, however in Scots the word can refer to a featureless place, lacking significant characteristics, something long and thin, or a boggy place. In Scots the snipe is variously known as a "bluiter wheep, earn-bleater, heather-bleat, mire-snipe, or moss-bleater." Nearby Loch Fergus and Martnaham Loch are larger and have clear defining features such as castles, islands, etc.

The farm was known as Glencaird on the early OS maps and Old Glencaird id now marked as Cloncaird Cottages.

Uses
The loch is a popular angling loch and is a bird watching site. It is stocked with rainbow trout and also contains perch. pike, and eels, and are frequented by wild-duck, teal, and widgeon. Nearly half of the lochshore is dominated by deciduous woodland.

See also
 Coylton
 Lindston Loch, South Ayrshire
 Martnaham Loch

References
Notes

Sources

 Love, Dane (2003). Ayrshire : Discovering a County. Ayr : Fort Publishing. .

External links
  Snipe Fishing Loch
  WeBS Count

Lochs of East Ayrshire
History of East Ayrshire
Freshwater lochs of Scotland